Andrea R Canaan (born 1950) is a Black feminist writer, speaker, community organizer, poet and activist.

Early life and education
Canaan was born in New Orleans, Louisiana in 1950. She was raised in a close activist and spiritual community. At twelve years old, Canaan was raped by a Methodist minister where she also faced abuse from a female church camp counselor. Canaan has also intimated that her mother was aware of this abuse and did nothing to help her child. Canaan has referenced this abuse in her work by touching upon themes of religious abuses of power and clergy misconduct.

Canaan holds a M.S.W. from University of Tulane and a M.F.A. in non-fiction from the University of San Francisco.

In 2018, she received a second M.F.A. in fiction from Goddard College in Vermont.

In the 1980s, Canaan served as the Director of Women and Employment which helps place women in non-traditional jobs.

Work
Canaan's creative passion is personal wholeness, the transformation of shame into courage for herself and in the lives of other black women.
Her work explores themes of black womanhood, sexual abuse, identity labels, and friendships between black women.

Bibliography 
 This Bridge Called My Back
 The Salt Box House on Bayou Black (TBA)

Book chapters

References

External links 
 

1950 births
African-American women writers
African-American writers
American memoirists
Writers from New Orleans
Living people
African-American feminists
American feminists
American women memoirists
21st-century African-American people
21st-century African-American women
20th-century African-American people
20th-century African-American women